Big Bad Love is a 2001 film directed by Arliss Howard, who co-wrote the script with his brother, James Howard, based on a collection of short stories of the same name by Larry Brown. The story recounts an episode in the life of an alcoholic Vietnam veteran and struggling writer named Leon Barlow, who is played by Arliss Howard, and his wife, played by Howard's wife Debra Winger. The soundtrack includes music by Tom Verlaine, the Kronos Quartet, and R. L. Burnside.

Plot
Big Bad Love shares its title and characters with those in Mississippi writer Larry Brown's short story collection, particularly those in the book's final story, "92 Days".

The main character is an unsuccessful alcoholic writer, motivated by desire for his estranged wife (played by Debra Winger) and the urging of his Vietnam War buddy Monroe (played by Paul Le Mat) to continue to write. He is angry, yet hopeful that he will sell a story. When tragedy strikes a close friend and his daughter, Leon is forced to rethink his way of life.

Reception
The New York Times reviewer A. O. Scott wrote, "For every moment of breathtaking strangeness -- as when Leon, after a road accident, awakens in a field of kudzu strewn with manuscript pages -- there is an overly stylized scene in which literary self-consciousness suffocates lived reality", "(the film) is a self-indulgent celebration of self-indulgence".  Lisa Schwarzbaum of Entertainment Weekly wrote, "Howard's Big Bad Love bewilders -- a whole lot of opulent Southern atmosphere about some stunted, opaque characters".  Ken Fox of TV Guide writes "The film's few saving graces include Dickinson's sardonic southern belle; Winger's welcome return to the screen after a five-year absence; and Howard's voice-over readings of Brown's powerful prose, which ultimately saves the film from itself.", while Rachel Gordon of Filmcritic wrote, "For his feature debut as director, Howard impressively mixes fantasy sequences with the depressing reality of pushing creativity as hard as you can against a tide of guilt", and Kevin Thomas of the Los Angeles Times wrote, "Big Bad Love is brave and admirable for the trust that it puts in a viewer's intuition and willingness in going along with it right through to its rewarding finish."

Cast
 Arliss Howard as Barlow
 Debra Winger as Marilyn
 Paul Le Mat as Monroe
 Rosanna Arquette as Velma
 Angie Dickinson as Mrs. Barlow
 Sigourney Weaver as Betti DeLoreo (voice)
 Michael Parks as Mr. Aaron
 Michael Owens as EMT
 Christopher Webster as The Smoking Clown

Production notes
It was filmed on location in parts of Mississippi.

Release
Big Bad Love had international release at film festivals before and after its 2002 theatrical release, including the 2001 Cannes Film Festival, the 2001 Toronto International Film Festival, the 2001 Austin Film Festival, and the 2002 Wisconsin Film Festival.

References

External links
 Big Bad Love at the Internet Movie Database
 Big Bad Love at Rotten Tomatoes

2001 films
Films based on short fiction
2001 drama films
American drama films
2000s English-language films
2000s American films